Paul Appleby (born June 29, 1983) is an American operatic tenor. In 2009 he won the Metropolitan Opera National Council Auditions. In November 2015 he made his debut at the San Francisco Opera as Tamino in Mozart's The Magic Flute. In December 2015 he was the tenor soloist in Mozart's Coronation Mass with the Pittsburgh Symphony Orchestra, and in January 2016 he performed Belmonte in Mozart's Die Entführung aus dem Serail with the Ann Arbor Symphony Orchestra. He sang Belmonte again at the Metropolitan Opera in May 2016.

Appleby is a graduate of [[St. Joseph High School (South Bend, Indiana), and the University of Notre Dame.

Appleby graduated from the Metropolitan Opera's Lindemann Young Artist Development Program and received the 2012 Leonore Annenberg Fellowship in the Performing and Visual Arts.

Awards
2012: Leonore Annenberg Fellowship in the Performing and Visual Arts". 
2012: Gerda Lissner Foundation".

Repertoire (selection)

 Bénédict, Béatrice et Bénédict (Berlioz)
 Belmonte, Die Entführung aus dem Serail (Mozart)
 Brian, Two Boys (Nico Muhly)
 Brighella, Ariadne auf Naxos (Richard Strauss) – Metropolitan Opera debut (2011)
 David, Die Meistersinger von Nürnberg (Wagner)
 Don Ottavio, Don Giovanni (Mozart)
 Ferrando, Così fan tutte (Mozart)
 Jonathan, Saul (Handel)
 Lysander, A Midsummer Night's Dream (Britten)
 Tamino, Die Zauberflöte (Mozart)
 Tom Rakewell, The Rake's Progress (Stravinsky)

Recordings
 Brian in Nico Muhly's Two Boys with conductor David Robertson, Metropolitan Opera, released 2013, Nonesuch Records
Dear Theo: Three Song Cycles by Ben Moore with Paul Appleby, Susanna Phillips, Brett Polegato; Brian Zeger, piano; released 2014, Delos Productions
The Juilliard Sessions: Paul Appleby; Schubert and Britten Songs, EMI Classics, 2012
Mozart: Mass in C minor & Piano Concerto No. 22 in E-flat major, K. 482 New York Philharmonic Alan Gilbert & Emanuel Ax, New York Philharmonic, 2012

DVDs
 The Enchanted Island, Metropolitan Opera Live in HD, Virgin Classics 2012

References

External links 
 
 

Living people
Juilliard School alumni
American operatic tenors
Winners of the Metropolitan Opera National Council Auditions
1983 births
21st-century American opera singers
Singers from Chicago
21st-century American male singers
21st-century American singers